Allan McLean (28 January 1899 – 6 December 1968) was an Australian rules footballer who played for the Melbourne Football Club in the Victorian Football League (VFL).

Notes

External links 

 

1899 births
1968 deaths
Australian rules footballers from Victoria (Australia)
Melbourne Football Club players